Christophe Guilluy (born October 14, 1964 in Montreuil, Seine-Saint-Denis) is a French geographer and author.

He is known for his theory on "peripheral France", which refers to mainly rural areas of France where many members of the political elite have lost contact with working-class people. He has used that theory to explain the rise of the far-right National Front in the country.

He also theorised the reason for American support of Donald Trump by the existence of a peripheral America during an interview in the French magazine Le Point.

Works 

Guilluy, Christophe (2000): Atlas de fractures françaises. Paris, Éditions L'Harmattan ISBN 978-2738493910
Guilluy, Christophe (2004) Atlas des nouvelles fractures sociales en France. Paris, Éditions Autrement, re-issued in 2006 ISBN 978-2746708228
Guilluy, Christophe (2013): Fractures françaises. Paris, Flammarion – Champs essais 
Guilluy, Christophe (2009): L'Annuel des idées 2009. Paris, Bourin Éditeur ISBN 978-2849411148
Guilluy, Christophe (2011): Plaidoyer pour une gauche populaire. Lormont, Éditions Le Bord de l'eau ISBN 978-2356871404
Guilluy Christophe (2014): La France périphérique: Comment on a sacrifié les classes populaires. Paris, Flammarion 
Guilluy, Christophe (2016): Le Crépuscule de la France d’en Haut. Paris, Flammarion, 
Guilluy, Christophe (2018): No Society. La fin de la classe moyenne occidentale. Paris, Flammarion, 
Guilluy, Christophe (2020): Le temps des gens ordinaires. Paris, Flammarion, 
Guilluy, Christophe and Mokritzky, Sacha (2022) Dialogue périphérique. Paris, Éditions du Zinc. ISBN 9782380740127
Guilluy, Christophe (2022): Les dépossédés, L'instinct de survie des classes populaires. Paris, Flammarion. ISBN 2080290134

References

External links
 – commentary in English on Guilluy's work.

1964 births
Living people
University of Paris alumni
French geographers
French male writers